Crisp County–Cordele Airport  is a county-owned, public-use airport located two nautical miles (4 km) northeast of the central business district of Cordele, a city in Crisp County, Georgia, United States. It is included in the National Plan of Integrated Airport Systems for 2011–2015, which categorized it as a general aviation facility. The airport does not have scheduled commercial airline service.

History 
Opened to the public in March 1943, during World War II, the airport was requisitioned by the United States Army Air Force, and was known as Cordele Army Airfield. It was also known as Turner AAF Auxiliary Airfield No. 7. The airfield supported the AAF Advanced Pilot School (Twin-Engine) school at Turner Army Airfield.

It was closed in mid-1944 with the drawdown of AAFTC's pilot training program. Declared surplus, it was turned over to the Army Corps of Engineers on September 30, 1945 and eventually discharged to the War Assets Administration (WAA) to become a civil airport.

Facilities and aircraft 
Crisp County–Cordele Airport covers an area of 619 acres (251 ha) at an elevation of 310 feet (94 m) above mean sea level. It has two asphalt paved runways: 10/28 is 5,001 by 150 feet (1,524 x 46 m) and 5/23 is 5,006 by 100 feet (1,526 x 30 m).

For the 12-month period ending August 10, 2010, the airport had 22,000 general aviation aircraft operations, an average of 60 per day. At that time there were 16 aircraft based at this airport: 94% single-engine and 6% helicopter.

See also 

 Georgia World War II Army Airfields
 List of airports in Georgia (U.S. state)

References

Other sources 
 
 Manning, Thomas A. (2005), History of Air Education and Training Command, 1942–2002.  Office of History and Research, Headquarters, AETC, Randolph AFB, Texas 
 Shaw, Frederick J. (2004), Locating Air Force Base Sites, History's Legacy, Air Force History and Museums Program, United States Air Force, Washington DC. 
 Shettle, M. L. (2005), Georgia's Army Airfields of World War II.

External links 
 CKF – Crisp County–Cordele at Georgia DOT website
 Departments: Airport at Crisp County website
 Aerial image as of January 1993 from USGS The National Map
 
 

Airports in Georgia (U.S. state)
Buildings and structures in Crisp County, Georgia
Transportation in Crisp County, Georgia
Airfields of the United States Army Air Forces in Georgia (U.S. state)